Luca Schuler may refer to:
Luca Schuler (skier) (born 1998), Swiss freestyle skier
Luca Schuler (footballer) (born 1999), German footballer